Bryan Clark (April 5, 1929 – September 9, 2022), sometimes credited as Bryan E. Clark, was an American film, television, and stage actor.

Career 
Clark studied singing, acting, dancing and performed with the Rockettes at Radio City Music Hall at the age of 15, also playing clarinet in a big band during his college years.

Over a career spanning several decades, his film roles included All the President's Men (1976), Trading Places (1983), Don't Tell Mom the Babysitter's Dead (1991), Without Warning: The James Brady Story (1991). His guest and recurring appearances in many television shows include Cheers, where he played the bartender Earl in Season 9, Wings, Becker, Suddenly Susan, St. Elsewhere, Who's the Boss?, The Nanny, Murphy Brown (playing Corky's dad), and Chicago Hope. 

Known for his "striking" resemblance to Ronald Reagan, he was often cast as him in various productions, including Guts and Glory: The Rise and Fall of Oliver North (1989), Without Warning: The James Brady Story (1991), Pizza Man (1991), and an episode of Dark Skies ("Bloodlines").

Clark was also known for being a spokesman for Folgers coffee in the 1980's and other friendly personalities in various commercials, including one for Tavern on the Green, and various stage roles. The New York Times complimented his performance in the 1978 Off-Broadway play Winning.

Personal life 
Clark was born in Louisville, Kentucky, the only child of pharmacist Bryan Clark and Maybelle Chester Clark. He spent many summers at Eugene O'Neil Playwright's Conference. He was married to actress Jo Deodato Clark for 65 years and they had five children.

References

External links 
 
 

1929 births
2022 deaths
American actors
Burials at Forest Lawn Memorial Park (Hollywood Hills)